LSZH may refer to:

 ICAO code for Zurich Airport
 Low smoke zero halogen, a type of cable jacketing